The 2009 NCAA Division II women's basketball tournament was the 28th annual tournament hosted by the NCAA to determine the national champion of Division II women's  collegiate basketball in the United States.

Minnesota State defeated Franklin Pierce in the championship game, 103–94, to claim the Mavericks' first NCAA Division II national title.

The championship rounds were contested at Bill Greehey Arena on the campus of the St. Mary's University in San Antonio, Texas.

Regionals

Atlantic - California, Pennsylvania
Location: Hamer Hall Host: California University of Pennsylvania

Midwest - Highland Heights, Kentucky
Location: Regents Hall Host: Northern Kentucky University

Central - Mankato, Minnesota
Location: Taylor Center Host: Minnesota State University, Mankato

East - Philadelphia, Pennsylvania
Location: Campus Center Gymnasium Host: Holy Family University

South - Cleveland, Mississippi
Location: Walter Sillers Coliseum Host: Delta State University

Southeast - Hickory, North Carolina
Location: Shuford Memorial Gymnasium Host: Lenoir-Rhyne College

South Central - Canyon, Texas
Location: First United Bank Center Site: West Texas A&M University

West - Seattle, Washington
Location: Royal Brougham Pavilion Host: Seattle Pacific University

Elite Eight - San Antonio, Texas
Location: St. Mary's Bill Greehey Arena Host: Saint Mary's University

All-tournament team
 Heather Johnson, Minnesota State
 Alex Andrews, Minnesota State
 Joanne Noreen, Minnesota State
 Jennifer Leedham, Franklin Pierce
 Johannah Leedham, Franklin Pierce

See also
 2009 NCAA Division I women's basketball tournament
 2009 NCAA Division III women's basketball tournament
 2009 NAIA Division I women's basketball tournament
 2009 NAIA Division II women's basketball tournament
 2009 NCAA Division II men's basketball tournament

References
 2009 NCAA Division II women's basketball tournament jonfmorse.com

 
NCAA Division II women's basketball tournament
2009 in Texas
Basketball in San Antonio